Vernon Christopher Carter (born December 18, 1986) is an American professional baseball first baseman and designated hitter for the Acereros de Monclova of the Mexican League. He previously played in Major League Baseball (MLB) for the Oakland Athletics, Houston Astros, Milwaukee Brewers, and New York Yankees. In 2016, while playing for the Brewers, Carter led the National League in home runs, along with Colorado Rockies third baseman Nolan Arenado, with 41.

Early life
Carter was born in Redwood City, California. At approximately age 7 or 8, his family moved to Las Vegas. He attended Sierra Vista High School. In 2005, Sierra Vista's baseball team won the Nevada Interscholastic Activities Association Class 4A state championship.

Professional career

Draft and minor leagues
Carter was drafted by the Chicago White Sox in the 15th round of the 2005 Major League Baseball Draft. Carter began his professional career with the  Bristol White Sox of the Rookie-level Appalachian League in 2005. He hit 10 home runs and had 37 runs batted in (RBIs). He played for two teams in the 2006 season. The teams included the Great Falls White Sox of the Rookie-level Pioneer League and the Kannapolis Intimidators of the Class A South Atlantic League. He had a combined total of 16 home runs and 63 RBIs. He played for Kannapolis in the 2007 season where he hit 25 home runs and had 93 RBIs.

During the 2007 offseason, the White Sox traded Carter to the Arizona Diamondbacks for Carlos Quentin.

Oakland Athletics (2010–2012)

Two weeks after he was traded to Arizona, the Diamondbacks traded Carter, Carlos González, Brett Anderson, Aaron Cunningham, Greg Smith, and Dana Eveland to the Oakland Athletics for Dan Haren and Connor Robertson. He played for the Stockton Ports of the Class A-Advanced California League in the 2008 season where he hit 39 home runs and had 104 RBIs. Carter was named the California League Rookie of the Year for the 2008 season. In 2009, Carter split time between the Midland RockHounds of the Class AA Texas League and the Sacramento River Cats of the Class AAA Pacific Coast League (PCL), putting a .329 batting average (a 70-point increase from 2008), 28 homers and 115 RBIs combined. In 2008 and 2009, Baseball America ranked Carter as one of the top 10 prospects in the Athletics' organization. Also in 2008 and 2009, Carter was the Oakland Athletics' Minor League Player of Year.

Carter was placed on the A's 40-man roster on November 20, 2009. In 2009, he was named the This Year in Minor League Baseball Awards "Overall Hitter of The Year". On August 9, 2010, Carter was promoted to Oakland and went 0–for–3 in his first game. On August 16, Carter was demoted to Sacramento after starting his career 0–for–19 with 12 strikeouts. After the AAA season ended, Carter was recalled to Oakland. On September 20, he snapped his 0–for–33 streak with a single in the sixth inning. On September 22, 2010 Carter hit his first major league home run against the Chicago White Sox.

Carter finished the 2010 season with a .186 batting average across 78 plate appearances and 24 games. He played in the Venezuelan Winter League upon completion of the 2010 season. He hit .136 in 15 MLB games the next year, spending most of that season in the Athletics' minor league system. He also split the 2012 season between MLB and the minor leagues, hitting .239 with 16 home runs and 39 RBI in 67 games.

Houston Astros (2013–2015)
After the 2012 season, the Athletics traded Carter to the Houston Astros with Brad Peacock and Max Stassi for Jed Lowrie and Fernando Rodriguez.

During the 2013 season, Carter played 148 games batting .223 with 29 home runs, 82 RBI, and struck out an MLB-leading 212 times. He became only the fourth player to strikeout 200 times in a season, with only Mark Reynolds having more strikeouts as a right-handed hitter.

The 2014 season started out even slower for Carter, as he batted only .153 throughout the entire month of April. Carter would turn his fortunes around after the All-Star break though, as finished with a .227 batting average and career highs of 37 home runs and 88 RBI. On January 14, 2015, Carter and the Astros agreed to a one-year contract worth $4.175 million, avoiding arbitration.

Carter had a disappointing 2015 season for the Astros. He was the team's starting first baseman, but hit only .199/.307/.427 in 129 games. For the season, he had the highest strikeout percentage among major leaguers against right-handed pitchers (35.6%). However, he still managed to hit 24 home runs, and then hit .294 with a home run against the Kansas City Royals during the 2015 American League Division Series. At the conclusion of the 2015 season Carter was non-tendered by the Astros, and became a free agent.

Milwaukee Brewers (2016)

On January 6, 2016, Carter signed a one-year, $2.5 million contract with the Milwaukee Brewers. He posted a .321 on-base percentage and hit 41 home runs, leading the National League in 2016, while also leading the NL in at bats per home run (13.4) and games played (160). However, he had a .222 batting average and led the league with 206 strikeouts, and had the lowest contact percentage on his swings in the major leagues (64.6%). On defense, he led the NL in errors at first base (11). The Brewers did not tender Carter a contract for the 2017, making him a free agent.

New York Yankees (2017)
On February 16, 2017, the New York Yankees signed Carter to a one-year contract, worth $3.5 million. Carter batted .204 with eight home runs and 70 strikeouts before the Yankees designated him for assignment on June 24. He was called back up by the Yankees on June 29 when his replacement at first base, Tyler Austin, landed on the disabled list. On July 4, he was again designated for assignment, this time to make room for Ji-man Choi on the roster. He was released on July 10. In 2017, he batted .201/.284/.370.

Return to the Oakland Athletics
Carter signed a minor league contract with the Oakland Athletics on July 21, 2017, and was assigned to the Nashville Sounds of the PCL. He elected free agency on November 6, 2017.

Los Angeles Angels
On February 18, 2018, Carter signed a minor league deal with the Los Angeles Angels.

Minnesota Twins
On May 22, 2018, the Angels traded Carter to the Minnesota Twins for cash. The Twins then assigned him to the Rochester Red Wings. He was released on July 7, 2018.

Acereros de Monclova
On February 13, 2019, Carter signed with the Acereros de Monclova of the Mexican League. In his first year with the club he led the league in Home runs (49) & RBIs (119), culminating in a victory in the Serie del Rey and the Acereros' first ever league championship. Carter did not play in a game in 2020 due to the cancellation of the Mexican League season because of the COVID-19 pandemic.

Personal life
Carter's father, Vernon, played basketball for Rancho High School in North Las Vegas. Carter is a car enthusiast. He owns a Shelby Super Snake.

See also

 Houston Astros award winners and league leaders
 List of Houston Astros team records
 List of Milwaukee Brewers team records
 Notable people from Redwood City

References

External links

1986 births
Living people
Sportspeople from the Las Vegas Valley
People from Redwood City, California
Baseball players from Nevada
Baseball players from California
African-American baseball players
Mexican people of African-American descent
Major League Baseball first basemen
Major League Baseball left fielders
Major League Baseball designated hitters
National League home run champions
Oakland Athletics players
Houston Astros players
Milwaukee Brewers players
New York Yankees players
Bristol White Sox players
Great Falls White Sox players
Kannapolis Intimidators players
Stockton Ports players
North Shore Honu players
Midland RockHounds players
Sacramento River Cats players
Algodoneros de Guasave players
Nashville Sounds players
Salt Lake Bees players
Rochester Red Wings players
Acereros de Monclova players
American expatriate baseball players in Mexico
21st-century African-American sportspeople
20th-century African-American people